is the fourth CD single by Minori Chihara. The single placed 17th on the Oricon charts in the same month it debuted.

Track listing

"Say You?"

"Say you? (off vocal)"

References

Minori Chihara songs
Lantis (company) singles
2008 singles
2008 songs